Deal is a surname. Notable people with the surname include:

Ame Deal (2000–2011), American murder victim
Borden Deal (1922–1985), American novelist and short story writer
Charlie Deal (1891–1979), Major League Baseball player
Cot Deal (1923–2013), Major League Baseball pitcher and coach
Gregg Deal (born 1975), American artist and activist 
Kelley Deal (born 1961), American musician
Kim Deal (born 1961), American singer, guitarist and bassist; identical twin sister of Kelley Deal
Lance Deal (born 1961), American hammer thrower and 1996 Olympic silver medalist
Nathan Deal (born 1942), American politician and Governor of Georgia
Robert Deal (d. 1721), English pirate
Sandra Deal (1942-2022), American educator and first lady of the U.S. state of Georgia